After the Flood is an upcoming British crime mystery thriller series written by Mick Ford and directed by Azhur Saleem. It stars Sophie Rundle as PC Joanna Marshall, a police officer investigating the death of an unidentified man after a natural disaster struck. The series is produced by Quay Street Productions for ITV and ITVX.

Plot
When an unidentified man was found dead in an underground car park after a devastating flood, PC Joanna Marshall is commissioned to investigate the truth of the man's death.

Cast
 Sophie Rundle as PC Joanna Marshall
 Philip Glenister as Jack Radcliffe
 Jonas Armstrong as Lee
 Nicholas Gleaves as DS Phil Mackie
 Jacqueline Boatswain as Sarah Mackie
 Matt Stokoe as Pat
 Lorraine Ashbourne as Molly Marshall

Production

Development 
In a press conference announcing the series' commission, executive producers Nicola Shindler and Richard Fee stated their interest in producing the series after the series' writer, Mick Ford presented the outline to them. Writer Mick Ford stated:

Casting 
On 16 February 2023, it was announced that Sophie Rundle was cast as lead character PC Joanna Marshall, alongside Philip Glenister, Lorraine Ashbourne and Nicholas Gleaves.

Filming 
Filming is set to begin in late February 2023 in Manchester, Derbyshire, West Yorkshire and Teesside.

References

External links
 

2023 British television series debuts
2020s British crime drama television series
2020s British mystery television series
British crime drama television series
British thriller television series
English-language television shows
ITV (TV network) original programming
Television series by ITV Studios
Upcoming television series